Energy bars are supplemental bars containing cereals, micronutrients, and flavor ingredients intended to supply quick food energy. Because most energy bars contain added protein, carbohydrates, dietary fiber, and other nutrients, they may be marketed as functional foods. Manufacturing of energy bars may supply nutrients in sufficient quantity to be used as meal replacements.

Nutrition
A typical energy bar weighs between 30 and 50 g and is likely to supply about 200–300 Cal (840–1,300 kJ), 3–9 g of fat, 7–15 g of protein, and 20–40 g of carbohydrates — the three sources of energy in food. In order to provide energy quickly, most of the carbohydrates are various types of sugars like fructose, glucose, maltodextrin and others in various ratios, combined with complex carbohydrate sources, such as oats or barley. Proteins come mostly in the form of whey protein. Fats sources are often cocoa butter and dark chocolate.

Usage 
Energy bars are used in a variety of contexts. Energy bars may be used as an energy source during athletic events such as marathons, triathlons and other activities which require a high energy expenditure for long periods of time. They are also commonly used as meal replacements in weight-loss programs. They may be used as a snack. For those who are malnourished, energy bars, such as Plumpy'nut, are an effective tool for treating malnutrition.

See also 

 Candy bar
 Protein bar
 Energy gel
 Sports drink
 High energy biscuits
 Flapjack (oat bar)
 D ration

References

 
Dietary supplements
Energy food products
Snack foods